John Wing may refer to:
 John Wing Jr., Canadian comedian and author
 John Durham Wing, American Episcopal bishop
 John Ian Wing, student whose anonymous letter to the International Olympic Committee altered the closing parade of the Summer Olympics